Korlam is a village in Srikakulam district of the Indian state of Andhra Pradesh. It is located in Sompeta mandal.

Demographics
Korlam village has population of 3,531 of which 1,648 are males while 1,883 are females as per Population 2011, Indian Census.

References

Villages in Srikakulam district